Minz is a surname. Notable people with the surname include:
 Abraham ben Judah Minz, Italian rabbi
 Judah ben Eliezer ha-Levi Minz, Italian rabbi
 Moses ben Isaac ha-Levi Minz, German rabbi of the 16th century
 Moses Minz (–1831), Hungarian rabbi

Minz is also the stage name of Nigerian Afro-beats singer and producer, Damilola Aminu

See also
 Mintz
 Muntz

References

Jewish surnames
Germanic-language surnames
Jewish families